Linnan is a family name, possibly of Irish origin. 

It is the name of the following people:

 Frank Linnan (Michael Francis Linnan) (1895 - 1981),  American Football player
 Laura Linnan (living), American academic
 Luke E. Linnan (1895 - 1975), American judge